Irreligious is the second studio album by Portuguese gothic metal band Moonspell, released in 1996. It features some of the best-known songs of the band, such as "Opium", "Ruin & Misery", "Awake!" and "Full Moon Madness". The latter is usually the closing song during almost every Moonspell concert, which over time has become a characteristic of their concerts. Before the song begins, Fernando Ribeiro often makes the sign of the circle (symbolizing Moon) over the crowd. The third track, "Awake!", features a recording of Aleister Crowley reading his poem "The Poet".

The album was promoted by the first Moonspell music video "Opium", which contained imagery of 19th-century-looking opium den.

Track listing

Personnel 
 Fernando Ribeiro – vocals
 Ricardo Amorim – guitars
 João Pedro Escoval (Ares) – bass
 Pedro Paixão – keyboards, samples
 Miguel Gaspar (Mike) – drums

Guest musicians
 Markus Freiwald – percussion on "For a Taste of Eternity"
 Birgit Zacher – vocals on "Raven Claws"

Production
 Rolf Brenner – photography
 Siggi Bemm – engineering
 Waldemar Sorychta – producer, mixing

Charts

References 

Moonspell albums
1996 albums
Century Media Records albums
Albums produced by Waldemar Sorychta